Marija Goranović (born 22 October 1995) is a Montenegrin footballer who plays as a defender. She has been a member of the Montenegro women's national team.

References

1995 births
Living people
Women's association football defenders
Montenegrin women's footballers
Montenegro women's international footballers
ŽFK Ekonomist players